Eduard Hrnčár (born 8 July 1978) is a Slovak international footballer, who last played as a defender for Kozani F.C.

Club career
Hrnčár began playing professional football with FC Nitra in 1996. He would spend three seasons with the club, appearing in 51 league matches. He would join ŠK Slovan Bratislava in 2000.

Hrnčár moved to Greece in July 2004, initially joining Greek second division side Niki Volos F.C. for one season. After one season with FK Kunovice in the Czech second division, Hrnčár would return to Greece and play in the Greek third division for Niki Volos, Preveza F.C. and Kozani F.C.

International career
Hrnčár made two appearances for the Slovakia national football team.

References

External links

1978 births
Living people
Slovak footballers
Slovakia international footballers
Slovakia under-21 international footballers
Football League (Greece) players
FC Nitra players
ŠK Slovan Bratislava players
Niki Volos F.C. players
Slovak expatriate footballers
Expatriate footballers in Greece
Association football defenders